The 170th Rifle Division was raised in 1939 as a standard Red Army rifle (infantry) division, as part of the prewar buildup of the Army. During July and August 1941, it gave very effective service in the battles around Velikiye Luki until it was so severely depleted that it had to be disbanded. A new 170th was formed between December 1941 and January 1942. From this point the division had a distinguished but relatively uncomplicated combat path, fighting in the central part of the Soviet-German front. It was given credit for the liberation of Rechytsa in late 1943, and ended the war in the conquest of East Prussia.

1st Formation 
The division was first organized at Sterlitamak in the Ural Military District in September 1939, based on a cadre from the 98th Rifle Division, as part of the major pre-World War II mobilization of the Red Army. The division was mostly composed of Bashkir soldiers and was commanded by Kombrig Tikhon Silkin. Division headquarters and most units were based at Sterlitamak. The 422nd Rifle and 512th Howitzer Regiments were at Belebey, and the 717th Rifle Regiment was at Davlekanovo. The 294th Light Artillery Regiment was based at Miass.

On June 22, 1941, its main order of battle was as follows:
 391st Rifle Regiment
 422nd Rifle Regiment
 717th Rifle Regiment
 294th Light Artillery Regiment
 512th Howitzer Regiment
 210th Antitank Battalion

Battle of Smolensk 
As Operation Barbarossa began, the 170th was moving west from the Urals as part of 22nd Army's 62nd Rifle Corps, to take up positions in the vicinity of Polotsk and Vitebsk. The division defended Sebezh on the Latvian border. At the beginning of July, retreating Soviet troops came to Sebezh. On 3 July, German bombers destroyed the town. The 391st and 717th Rifle Regiment moved to the Kuznetsovka railway station, while the 422nd Rifle Regiment stayed in place. For two days, the division attempted to hold back advancing German troops. On 11 July, the division retreated to positions around Zamość station. On 13 July, the division was ordered to attack. The division was initially successful, pushing back German troops to Kuznetsovka station. However, the division was then forced to retreat back to Idritsa due to German superiority in both numbers and firepower.  Around this time, Major General Silkin went missing and was presumed killed. Colonel Nikolai Laksin took command of the division.

After taking Nevel on July 15, the German LVII Motorized Corps was ordered to capture Velikiye Luki. This isolated thrust by one panzer and one motorized division took the city on July 19, but Soviet counterattacks against the supply corridor, in part by the 170th from the west, forced the German forces to give up the city and retreat. On 20 July, the division became part of the 51st Rifle Corps and moved to positions northwest of Nevel. The division was ordered to counterattack, but met strong resistance and was stopped in the area of Hamchino. The division was surrounded on part of the Leningrad Highway, known as the Nevel Pocket. The division attempted to break out at Begunovo and Zabolote. The division was forced to destroy equipment and suffered heavy losses in the encirclement. On 23 July, the remnants of the division reached the area of Lake Urai and took up defensive positions. The division was again forced to retreat and on 26 July moved to the Dokuhino area, where it absorbed the remnants of the 98th and 112th Rifle Divisions. On 28 August the division was reported as having just 300 men with "...no equipment, headquarters or staff". It was transferred to 24th Army in Reserve Front for rebuilding in September, but was far from complete when the Germans launched Operation Typhoon. It was surrounded with its army north of Spas-Demensk by 1 October, and was disbanded on 4 October, due to a shortage of equipment.

2nd Formation 
A new 170th Rifle Division was formed at Molotov, once again in the Ural Military District, based on the 439th Rifle Division which was already forming up when re-designated. The order of battle remained mostly the same, with the following additions:
 286th Antiaircraft Battalion
 134th Reconnaissance Battalion
 182nd Sapper Battalion
 210th Signal Battalion
The howitzer regiment had been removed, and the standard artillery regiment retained the number of the original light regiment.

In February 1942, the division was deployed to the west, into the 58th Army of the Reserve of the Supreme High Command, and in April it deployed to the front lines in the 34th Army of Northwestern Front. The 170th took part in the fighting around the Demyansk Pocket during the rest of 1942, either under command of the 34th or the 11th Army. In January 1943, it was reassigned to the 27th Army, and in March was once again in the Reserve of the Supreme High Command for rebuilding and a redeployment to the south.

By the beginning of June, the 170th was assigned to the Central Front in the Kursk salient. The division joined the 48th Army, and remained there for the duration, with the exception of a few months in early 1944.

Advance 
In January 1944, the division became part of the 42nd Rifle Corps, where it would remain for the duration. Belorussian Front was renamed 1st Belorussian in February. During the Soviet summer offensive, Operation Bagration, the 42nd Corps was concentrated north of Rogachev to assist its partner 29th Rifle Corps and units of the 3rd Army to break through the positions of the German 134th and 296th Infantry Divisions. By late on June 24 this had been achieved, with the Germans overwhelmed and the 9th Tank Corps exploiting to the rear. With the defenses of Army Group Center shattered, the division trekked westward towards Poland.

48th Army was transferred to 2nd Belorussian Front in the late autumn of 1944. During the Vistula-Oder Offensive the 170th pushed on through northern Poland before the army was once again transferred to 3rd Belorussian Front. The division fought in the East Prussian Offensive, and ended the war near Elbing.

Five men of the division were named as Heroes of the Soviet Union, two of them posthumously. At the end of the war the men and women of the division carried the full title 170th Rifle, Rechytsa, Order of the Red Banner, Order of Suvorov Division. (Russian: 170-я стрелковая Речицкая Краснознамённая ордена Суворова дивизия.) The division was part of the 42nd Rifle Corps, 48th Army of the 3rd Belorussian Front in May 1945. The division was disbanded near Mühlhausen in July 1945.

Notes

Infantry divisions of the Soviet Union in World War II
Military units and formations established in 1939
Military units and formations disestablished in 1945